15205/15206 Jabalpur - Lucknow Chitrakoot Express  is a daily Express Train of the Indian Railways, which runs between Jabalpur Junction railway station of Jabalpur, an important city & military cantonment hub of Central Indian state Madhya Pradesh and Lucknow railway station, the capital city of Uttar Pradesh.

Arrival and departure
Train no.15205 departs from Lucknow Junction (LJN) daily at 05:30 PM reaching Jabalpur (JBP) the next day at 05:30 AM.
Train no.15206 departs from Jabalpur (JBP) daily at 08:50 PM, reaching Lucknow (LJN) the next day at 09:30 AM.

Coach composite
The train consists of Coaches :
 1 AC I & II Tier
 4 AC III Tier
 6 Sleeper Coaches
 11 Unreserved
 1 Ladies/Handicapped
 1 Luggage/Brake Van

Average speed and frequency
The train runs with an average speed of around 48 km/h. The train runs on a daily basis.

Loco link
The train is hauled by WDM-3A (Katni Loco Shed)

Rake maintenance 
The train is maintained by the Jabalpur Coaching Depot.

See also
Dayodaya Express
Jabalpur Junction
Bhopal Junction

References

Passenger trains originating from Lucknow
Transport in Jabalpur
Railway services introduced in 2005
Named passenger trains of India
Rail transport in Madhya Pradesh
Express trains in India
Rail transport in Uttar Pradesh